SoftSolutions was a very early document management system (or DMS), which was used primarily by law firms. While the system was in (relatively) wide use, it was purchased by WordPerfect in 1994, which was subsequently purchased by Novell in 1995, and was incorporated into NetWare 4.1. SoftSolutions was subsequently terminated as a product, but its features were incorporated into Novell's Group Wise product. 

SoftSolutions is one of many products which caused near apocalyptic fears at the end of the 20th century, due to its "Y2K" non-compliance.

References

Content management systems